WNIT (channel 34) is a PBS member television station in South Bend, Indiana, United States, owned by the Michiana Public Broadcasting Corporation. The station's studios are located at the corner of Lafayette and Jefferson Boulevards in downtown South Bend, and its transmitter is located just off of the St. Joseph Valley Parkway in the southern portion of South Bend.

History
WNIT's antenna and transmitter were purchased from KFIZ-TV in Fond du Lac, Wisconsin, after that station went dark in November 1972. The station first signed on the air in February 1974 (the "-TV" suffix was used in the call letters from 1974 to 1989). Prior to the station's launch, PBS programs had been offered to the market's commercial stations on a per-program basis, while Chicago member station WTTW was available over-the-air in the extreme western portions of the market. Channel 34's original studio facilities were located at the Elkhart Area Career Center on California Road in Elkhart.

On February 26, 2008, the klystron tube that powered WNIT's transmitter failed, which reduced WNIT's analog signal strength to only 15 percent of its normal 1.38 million-watt effective radiated power. The transmitter's major signal amplifiers subsequently failed on March 25, completely disabling the station's analog signal. With analog broadcasting due to end in the United States in 2009, the station opted to broadcast solely in digital. Most viewers did not lose access to WNIT programming due to the high penetration of cable and satellite television in the area.

On January 11, 2009, a fire severely damaged WNIT's administrative offices in Elkhart; there were no injuries resulting from the fire and the station's broadcast facilities and programming were unaffected. Local program production continued at the Elkhart Area Career Center and the station's administrative offices moved to a temporary location in the Tower Building on West Franklin Street in downtown Elkhart.

This arrangement continued until May 11, 2010, when WNIT moved to CBS affiliate WSBT-TV (channel 22)'s former studio on Lafayette and Jefferson streets in downtown South Bend. On December 17, 2008, WNIT had acquired and taken possession of the  facility with the assistance of an in-kind donation by WSBT's owner, Schurz Communications; that station had moved to new facilities in Mishawaka in September 2008.

In December 2020, the station re-branded as PBS Michiana and adopted the current PBS logo.

Technical information

Subchannels
The station's digital signal is multiplexed:

Analog-to-digital conversion
WNIT's analog signal, over UHF channel 34, shut down on March 25, 2008, due to the problems with its analog transmitter. The station's digital signal remained on its pre-transition UHF channel 35, using PSIP to display the station's virtual channel as its former UHF analog channel 34.

References

External links

WNIT Facebook

PBS member stations
Television channels and stations established in 1974
NIT (TV)
1974 establishments in Indiana